The Dead and Dreaming is the second full-length album by American metal band Dry Kill Logic. It was released in the United States on October 5, 2004, by Repossession Records. The international version of the album was distributed by SPV. Only one song, "Paper Tiger", was released as a single. In this album, the band takes a different direction, leaving the nu metal sound and changing into metalcore.

Track listing

Note: Track 11 is replaced by the song "Hindsight" on the international version of the album.

Personnel 
 George Marino – mastering
 Paul Orofino – engineer, mixing
 Eddie Wohl – producer, engineer, mixing
 Rob Caggiano – guitar, engineer, producer, A&R, mixing
 Cliff Rigano – lead vocals
 Aaron Marsh – artwork, design, photography
 Phil Arcuri – guitar, drums, group member, photography, producer
 Jason Bozzi – guitar, bass guitar, group member, producer
 Dave Kowatch – bass guitar

References

External links

Dry Kill Logic albums
2004 albums